William John McCappin was an Irish clergyman in the second half of the 20th century.

Born in  1919 and educated at Trinity College, Dublin,
he was ordained in 1943 and began his career as a curate at St Mark, Armagh. He was a Chaplain to the Forces  from 1944 to 1947 and then Curate in charge of Ardoyne until 1951. He held incumbencies at St Patrick, Jordanstown and then St Bartolomew, Belfast before becoming   Archdeacon of Connor in 1969 and Connor in 1981.  He retired in 1987 and died on 3 July 1992.

References

1919 births
Alumni of Trinity College Dublin
Archdeacons of Connor
20th-century Anglican bishops in Ireland
Bishops of Connor
1991 deaths
Irish military chaplains
World War II chaplains